Anachis richardi is a species of sea snail in the family Columbellidae, the dove snails.

References

richardi
Gastropods described in 1906